This is a list of largest Hindu ashrams in terms of area.

See also
 List of tallest Gopurams
 List of large temple tanks
 List of human stampedes in Hindu temples
 Lists of Hindu temples by country
 List of largest Hindu temples

References 

.

 
 L
Hindu ashrams